Once Was Not is the fifth album by Canadian technical death metal band Cryptopsy.

Once Was Not is the first album to feature original vocalist Lord Worm since 1996's None So Vile, and would be his last with the band. It is also the first album not to feature original guitarist Jon Levasseur (Levasseur does however perform a featured appearance on opening track "Luminum"). 

Unlike previous albums, where Lord Worm's lyrical content consisted of gore, blasphemy, and sex, his lyrics on Once Was Not dealt with topics that affect the human race, such as war, famine, plague, and death.

A digipack edition was released, limited to 10,000 copies, which comes in an embossed digipack with an entirely gold-ink-printed booklet.

A video was filmed for the track "The Pestilence That Walketh in Darkness".

Track listing

Personnel

Cryptopsy
 Lord Wormvocals
 Alex Auburnguitar, backing vocals
 Eric Langloisbass guitar
 Flo Mounierdrums, backing vocals

Additional personnel
 Jon Levasseur – guitar on "Luminium"
 François Quévillon – artwork, design
 Martin Lacroix – artwork, illustration
 Ange Curcio – engineering (drums)
 U.E. Nastasi – mastering
 Sébastien Marsan – production, engineering, mixing
 Filip Ivanovic – booklet cover, back cover illustrations

References 

2005 albums
Cryptopsy albums
Century Media Records albums